Studio fotografico Vasari it is one of the oldest Italian companies operating in the field of photography.

The studio is known for its specialization in architectural photographs and works of art, and for having documented the transformation of Rome in the twentieth century.

Collections of Vasari photographs are held by the International Museum of Photography and Film at George Eastman House in Rochester (New York), at the Istituto Nazionale per la Grafica in Rome, and at the Centro studi e archivio della comunicazione (CSAC) of the University of Parma.

History 

The company founder Cesare Vasari (Arezzo, 30 May 1846 - Rome, 31 May 1901) moved to Rome in 1860, working initially for professional photographers. He become a collaborator of Tommaso Cuccioni's widow, Isabella Bonafede. In 1875 he opened one of the first ateliers for the production of art and architecture photographs.

After Cesare moved to Florence, the Roman atelier passed to his nephew Alessandro (Rome, 1 July 1866 - 18 March 1929); Alessandro's son Tommaso (Rome, March 21, 1894 - August 25, 1971) documents the artistic and architectural story of Rome of the Twenties, becoming a supplier of the Royal House, and photographing the post-war reconstruction.

Initially, the laboratory for the development and printing of the photographs was located in via della Mercede, subsequently transferred to via Ludovisi and finally to via Condotti, where all the processing of the negatives was carried out, the subsequent printing and final retouching.

Tommaso, who had two children (Laura and Giorgio), was succeeded by Giorgio, a doctor in chemistry (Rome, 11 September 1931 - Filettino, 3 July 2004). Under Giorgio, the business developed in the fields of art, architecture and industry, including the photographic documentation of public works for the 1960 Olympics, the headquarters of the major companies of the Italian "economic boom", as well as editions that dealt with the most important basilicas, churches and Roman galleries of art and antiques.

Subsequently, Giorgio's sons (Alessandro, Andrea and Francesco) continued the studio's activity, establishing the Vasari Photographic Archive and enriching it through photographic campaigns commissioned by state bodies, museums, private collections and national and international publishers.

Today the company is directed by Alessandro Vasari (Rome, 25 February 1957).

Vasari and the architecture 
The specialization in architectural photography began at first under Cesare Vasari, but Tommaso and Giorgio added a strong impulse to this kind of shooting with their work for important architects such as Enrico Del Debbio, Pier Luigi Nervi, Luigi Walter Moretti and Giuseppe Vaccaro

The photographic archive 
The historical archive of Vasari which contains 5,024 plate (in glass 21x27 cm and other 13x18 cm). It is currently available at the Chalcography-Istituto Nazionale per la Grafica.

The third party production from 1910 ca. to immediately postwar period, consisting of 350,000 black and white and color plates and negatives, is kept in the Study and Communication Archive Center (CSAC) of the University of Parma.

The Vasari private archive (about 90,000 films of various positive, negative black/white and color formats and high resolution digital files). This constantly expanding fund includes the photographic production of the Vasari to date and can be consulted on a research database by subject, author and location via the website of the photographic studio.

Exhibitions on Vasari photographers 
 Rome 1991: The Vasari: a dynasty of photographers in Rome from 1875 to 1991, 26 February - 30 April, Biblioteca Vallicelliana of Oratorio dei Filippini
 Parma 1994: Plaster and clay: Vasari Rome studio, the Ximenes atelier, curated by Paolo Barbaro, texts by Marzio Pieri, CSAC of University of Parma.
 Milan 2010: Walk the Stones - a journey through time and the streets of Rome, Spazio ILEX of Archivolto - Milan, 14–30 April
 Stockholm 16 October - 6 November 2014:  At the origins of the European Union. Italian architecture and art for the Palazzo della Farnesina, Istituto Italiano di Cultura
 Berlin 12 November - 4 December 2014:  At the origins of the European Union. Italian architecture and art for the Palazzo della Farnesina, Italian Embassy
 Skopje 11 December 2014 - 21 January 2015:  At the origins of the European Union. Italian architecture and art for the Palazzo della Farnesina, Macedonian National Gallery "Chifte Hamam"

Gallery

See also 
 Istituto Nazionale per la Grafica
 Centro studi e archivio della comunicazione
 George Eastman House
 Tommaso Cuccioni

References

Further reading 
 Alberto Manodori, Alessandro Vasari, Roma mai più Roma: attraverso le fotografie di Alessandro Vasari, Edizioni Golden Series, 1983 
 Marina Miraglia, Cesare Vasari e il "genere" nella fotografia napoletana dell'Ottocento, in Bollettino d'Arte, serie VI, 33–34, pp. 199–296
 Biblioteca Vallicelliana, I Vasari: una dinastia di fotografi a Roma dal 1875 al 1991, a cura della Biblioteca Vallicelliana, catalogo della mostra, Roma 1991
 Paolo Barbaro, testi di Marzio Pieri, Il *gesso e la creta: studio Vasari Roma, l'atelier Ximenes, catalogo della mostra, CSAC dell'Università, Parma 1994, codice SBN BVE0084839
 Anita Margiotta e M. Grazia Massafra, Un percorso fotografico a palazzo Braschi (1870-1987). Catalogo della mostra (anche e-book), pag. 129, Gangemi Editore, Roma 2012,  
 Roberta Tucci, I suoni della campagna romana. Per una ricostruzione del paesaggio sonoro di un territorio del Lazio., con CD Audio, pag. 206, Rubettino Editore, Soveria Mannelli 2003,  
 Francesca Recine, La documentazione fotografica dell'arte in Italia dagli albori all'epoca moderna, pp. 49 e 50, Edizioni Scriptaweb, Napoli 2006 
 Francesco Buranelli, Laocoonte: alle origini dei Musei Vaticani, pag. 80 e 136, Edizioni L'Erma di Bretschneider, Roma 2006,  
 Marina Miraglia,Fotografi e pittori alla prova della modernità, Bruno Mondadori Editore, Milano 2012,

External links 
 Website of the Photographic Archive 
 Ministry of Cultural Heritage and Activities (Italy) - Central Institute for Catalog and Documentation
 I Vasari, exhibition catalog held at the Biblioteca Vallicelliana (in Italian).
 Photographs of the Vasari Studio fund at the National Institute for Graphics (in Italian)
  Fondo Vasari at the Istituto Centrale per la Grafica, Ministry of Cultural Heritage and Activities (MIBACT) (in Italian)
  Il Fondo Vasari nel Catalogo del Sistema Museale dell'Università di Parma (in Italian)
 
 Vasari Images at the International Museum of Photography and Film in Rochester
 
 
 
 

Italian Royal Warrant holders
Italian photographers
Photo agencies